Urbicide is a term which literally translates (Latin: urbs: city + Latin: occido: to kill) as "violence against the city". The term was first coined by the author Michael Moorcock in 1963 and later used since the 1960s by urban planners and architects. Ada Louise Huxtable in 1968 and Marshall Berman in 1996 have written about urban restructuring (and destruction) in areas like the Bronx, and highlight the impacts of aggressive redevelopment on the urban social experience. The term has come into being in an age of rapid globalization and urbanization. This rapid globalization trend has led to the focus of violence and destruction in the context of the city rather than its surroundings.

Especially after the siege of Sarajevo, recognition has begun to be given to the cases of violence specifically directed to the destruction of an urban area. The exact constraints and definition of this term continue to be debated because the limits of this emerging concept make it extremely difficult to categorize events under the heading of urbicide. The question of intent also arises when discussing the limits of urbicide. The ability of term to cross a variety of fields such as international politics, anthropology, and sociology makes it particularly difficult to set a finite definition of urbicide which satisfies all these fields.

Terminology 

The term "urbicide" has its roots in the Latin word urbs, meaning "city", and occido, meaning "to massacre". In 1944, Raphael Lemkin defined genocide as "a coordinated plan of different actions aiming at the destruction of essential foundations of national groups, with the aim of annihilating the groups themselves". This term, however, failed to address violence not aimed at human bodies. The first recorded use of the term "urbicide" was by Michael Moorcock in the Elric novella "Dead God's Homecoming" (Science Fantasy #59, Nova Publishing, June 1963). In the wake of the destruction of Sarajevo, the term gained more common usage, examples being found in the works of Marshall Berman (1987) and Bogdan Bogdanović. In their 1992 publication "Mostar '92", a group of Bosnian architects from Mostar used the term urbicide to define the violence against the city fabric, such as the destruction of the Mostar bridge, a usage consistent with Marshall Berman's prior use of the term to describe similar acts of violence in Bosnia. Urbicide is increasingly being used by architects, urban planners, scholars and historians to help describe and understand the contemporary and historic wars where cities can no longer be considered safe havens from war, but rather are part of the battlefield.

Some people argue that urbicide should be understood as a part of genocide, as to destroy people's homes is to destroy them. In his book Urbicide, Martin Coward argues along a similar line. Rather than use urbicide for all violence against the city, Coward uses the term to denote violence which seeks to annihilate difference through the destruction of the material foundation of that difference. The urban is meant to imply the material foundation of heterogeneity (being with others as being with otherness), and he interprets some instances of destruction of the city as an attempt to destroy the material foundations of that heterogeneity. Urbicide would then share the annihilatory character of genocide, but not necessarily its focus on human beings as the object of destruction.

The definition of urbicide is interdependent on the definitions of city and violence. In many urbicidal incidents, one or both of these definitions has been removed from the situation's context by the perpetrator. Either the "city" receiving the violence has been demoted from its status as "city", or the violent act is not considered violent. The meaning of the words city and violence therefore become highly important when classifying an act as urbicidal.

A city is an area consisting of numerous institutions, residents, industries, and businesses supported by large infrastructure and a dense and diverse population. A city can be framed in numerous ways. For example, it can be thought of as an economic system, in which all social relations stem from a market economy, and the city is produced and shaped by the market. A city can also be thought of as a state of mind, in which all people who live in the city share the same consciousness. Similarly, it can be seen as an aggregation of different social/cultural forms, making cities a center for heterogeneity.  Finally, a city can be seen from an architectural perspective, as a conglomeration of masses and spaces. As Henri Lefebvre states, "a city is, therefore, whatever is experienced, known, represented, constructed, or destroyed as a city."
Violence is typically defined as, "a behaviour involving physical force intended to hurt, damage, or kill" (Compact Oxford Dictionary). However, when defining violence sociologists, historians, philosophers and other scholars have identified other less direct forms of violence that should also be considered. Nancy Scheper-Hughes and Philippe Bourgois write in their book Violence in War and Peace that "Violence can never be understood solely in terms of its physicality – force, assault, or the infliction of pain – alone. Violence also includes assaults on the person hood, dignity, sense of worth or value of the victim.  The social and cultural dimensions of the violence are what gives violence its power and meaning."

Some of the other categories are structural violence, symbolic violence, and violence enacted by the government through laws or actions. Structural violence occurs when the structure of a society causes the violence. Examples of this include laws that create unequal access to public amenities or affect different citizens based on their status in society. Symbolic violence concerns socially accepted norms that are ingrained over time such as the roles of different classes, genders and ethnic groups. Finally political violence addresses the harm the government can inflict by their actions either through neglect or action.  All of these forms of violence can also be characterized in urbicide.

While physical destruction of a city's buildings is the most obvious form of urbicide, it can also occur in less noticeable ways.  Governments redefining areas of the city as slums or "illegitimate" can lead to an unequal treatment of citizens. For people living in these areas they have been denied their citizenship. How a government zones a city can also generate violence. While not directly causing harm, certain zoning combinations could increase violence, decrease the value of properties, and force poorer people into an undesirable neighborhood.

Cases 

The hybrid nature of the term urbicide suggests that it is either a radical framework through which to view the historical destruction of cities, or something appropriate only to the "now" and has mandatory qualities in the present. Whereas in its first modern manifestations the targeting and destruction of cities was seen as something new, outside the traditional rules of European warfare, Marshall Berman, an American Marxist writer and political theorist, proposes that urbicide is the oldest story in the world. In his view, the Old Testament books of Jeremiah and Lamentations appropriately cover urbicide, or mark its beginnings. In later times the Roman Empire imposed the complete destruction of Jerusalem and a similarly devastating Carthaginian peace, though these proved less than permanent. Berman also cited the destruction of Tenochtitlán (1521), Moscow (1812), Dresden, Tokyo, Hiroshima and Nagasaki (all of these in 1945). Nonetheless, Berman's view of potential "urbicidal" events is very much within the Marxist historical telos, which suppresses the contingency of urbicide in history, or rather, its own telos.

Many cities are in some sense imperial cities, having created an empire (Babylon, Rome), or been created by one (Persepolis, Cairo, Philadelphia) or greatly expanded (Byzantium, Delhi) or have become the capital of one (Peking, London) or received special privileges from an empire, for example as Free Imperial Cities.  Thus there are perspectives that see urbicide as part of broader imperialist goals, for example in the elimination of cities by Communist Cambodia. Writers and  geographers such as Mike Davis, Nurhan Abujidi and Stephen Graham represent some of these currents. The Nazis' deliberate destruction of Warsaw, as well as the Siege of Sarajevo, which led to the "coining" of the most current and popular definition of urbicide, stand as the most symbolic historical events representative of urbicide. Recent events in the Israeli–Palestinian conflict, Zimbabwe, post-Katrina New Orleans, and Iraq also stand as significant urbicidal examples, and can be taken as a broad spectrum of "violence against the city," indicating the fluidity or multi-faceted discourse of urbicide.

Vukovar

The siege of Vukovar was an 87-day military campaign aimed against the eastern Croatian city of Vukovar led by the Yugoslav People's Army, supported by various Serbian paramilitary forces between August and November 1991 during the Croatian War of Independence. Vukovar suffered an  indiscriminate bombardment, in which up to a million shells were fired on the city, Three quarters of the city's buildings were destroyed. 
Among them were schools, hospitals, churches, public institutions’ facilities, factories, the medieval Eltz Castle and the house of the Nobel laureate scientist Lavoslav Ružička. Several sources, like the Youth Initiative for Human Rights in Serbia, described the systematic destruction of the city as urbicide. Youth Initiative for Human Rights in Serbia also criticized the International Criminal Tribunal for the former Yugoslavia in 2009 for not reaching a verdict for the destruction of Vukovar. Slobodan Milošević was indicted for, inter alia, "wanton destruction" of the city, but died before a verdict was reached. Goran Hadžić was also indicted in the same category and also died while awaiting trial in 2016.

Sarajevo

Violence in Sarajevo was a product of the Bosnian War, which lasted from 1992–1995  in which Serb forces of the Republika Srpska and the Yugoslav People's Army besieged Sarajevo. This region was very ethnically diverse, providing homes for both Serbs and Muslim Slavs. The violence is sometimes referred to as ethnic cleansing which ended in some of the worst violence this region has ever seen. Ultimately, urbicide resulted in the complete annihilation of Sarajevo's built environment. This broke down the city's infrastructure and denied thousands of civilians food, water, medicine, etc. In the wake of this violence, Sarajevo's civilians also became victims of human rights offenses including rape, execution, and starvation. The Bosnian government declared the siege over in 1996.

The International Criminal Tribunal for the former Yugoslavia (ICTY) convicted four Serb officials for numerous counts of crimes against humanity which they committed during the siege, including terrorism. Stanislav Galić and Dragomir Milošević were sentenced to life imprisonment and 29 years imprisonment respectively. Their superiors, Radovan Karadžić and Ratko Mladić, were also convicted and sentenced to life imprisonment.

Warsaw

During the Nazi occupation of Poland, Nazi Germany deliberately razed most of the city of Warsaw after the 1944 Warsaw Uprising. The uprising had infuriated German leaders, who decided to make an example of the city, although Nazi Germany had long selected Warsaw for major reconstruction as part of their Lebensraum policy and Generalplan Ost, the plans to Germanize Central and Eastern Europe and eliminate, ethnically cleanse, or enslave the native Polish and Slavic populations.

The Nazis dedicated an unprecedented effort to destroy the city. Their decision tied up considerable resources which could have been used at the Eastern Front and at the newly-opened Western Front following the Normandy landings. The Germans destroyed 80–90% of Warsaw's buildings and deliberately demolished, burned, or stole an immense part of its cultural heritage, completely destroying Warsaw's Old Town.

Zimbabwe
While the term "urbicide" finds its genesis in the urban destruction and targeting associated with the Bosnian Wars of the early 1990s, its meaning(s) develops historically and in the present. Recent events in Zimbabwe, while falling under the definition of urbicide as selective violence and destruction against cities, also positions urbicide outside the dynamics of genocidal warfare. Operation Murambatsvina or "Operation Restore Order" was a countrywide program of targeted violence against cities, towns, peripheral urban areas, and resettled farms, resulting in the destruction of housing, trading markets, and other "collective" structures. It was a large-scale operation, strategically resulting in the displacement of over 700,000 refugees, and "knowingly" manufacturing a massive humanitarian crisis. Beyond the obvious violations of human rights, Operation Murambatsvina is striking in its abilities to literally unhinge the urban and rural poor from the collective structures integral to everyday, grounded existence in favor of dispersal, but without active state measures to reinstitute these people within governable spaces. Though Operation Murambatsvina has been seen as urbicidal, the question has been raised as to whether an urbicidal framework seeks a different subtext.

Aleppo

Robert Templer and AlHakam Shaar proposed that the deliberate destruction of Aleppo during the Battle of Aleppo was a form of "urbicide".

Mariupol

During the 2022 Russian invasion of Ukraine, the Russian Army destroyed several cities in eastern Ukraine, causing a deliberate destruction of vital civilian infrastructure, including in Severodonetsk, Kramatorsk, Mariupol and Bakhmut. It was described by the New Lines Institute as follows: "from the onset of Russian President Vladimir Putin’s invasion of Ukraine, Russia has engaged in a sustained and systematic campaign of urbicide".

Human rights 
Human rights discourse provides another lens in which we can view urbicide, especially through the use of The United Nations Universal Declaration of Human Rights. Using the term urbicide, usually refers to violence and destruction of buildings and architecture, but when also using the UN's Declaration along with urbicide, the focus is instead on people. Looking at violent acts and observing how they affect people, their culture and their safety inevitably centers on human rights and may often carry more validity for these urbicidal acts to also be cases of human rights violations.

The following cases are viewed here with a greater focus on the human rights aspect of them. The term urbicide can still apply, but human rights language may allow for a more familiar approach to these cases as many people are already aware of the general rights that people hold. These rights are explicitly stated here to fully demonstrate how fundamental rights are being violated as part of urbicide:

Sarajevo
Article 3 of the UN Universal Declaration of Human Rights states that everyone has the right to life, liberty and security of person and Article 5 states that no one shall be subjected to torture, or to cruel, inhuman or degrading treatment or punishment. However, 20,000 Muslim women and girls were raped by Serbs, thousands were missing and/or executed. When using the term urbicide, human rights should be included because atrocities like this also affect the culture and feeling of the city. They must be taken into account when the urbicidal effects of bombings and military actions in the region are being examined because they show that the conflict was more than simply destroying the physical city buildings; there was destruction of people, their safety and of their communities.

Zimbabwe
700,000 Zimbabweans were forced from their urban homes and were left to create new lives for themselves during Operation Murambatsvina in May 2005. Many say this breaks the UN's Article 25 which says: Everyone has the right to a standard of living adequate for the health and well-being of himself and of his family, including food, clothing, housing and medical care and necessary social services, and the right to security in the event of unemployment, sickness, disability, widowhood, old age or other lack of livelihood in circumstances beyond his control. The government forcibly removed these citizens from where they were living knowingly displaced them, leaving them without resources and access to food, shelter and health care.

International law 

As of now there is no explicit language mentioning urbicide in international and humanitarian law. As the term has been coined and interpreted only recently, during the Yugoslav war in the 1990s, it has not reached public consciousness and public discourse to such extent as to be an instantiated into international law. If genocide and urbicide, however, are synonymous terms, as some theorists propose, it could be argued that urbicide is already prohibited by international law. It can also be argued that urbicide, as destruction of urban spaces and human habitations, is made illegal under international law and humanitarian law through the effects of other laws dealing with destruction of human-made environment and people's dependency upon it. Such laws are the rights to adequate housing, the right to life and privacy, to mental integrity, and to the freedom of movement. The most salient example of Sarajevo, where the term urbicide partly originated, clearly demonstrates the violation of these basic human rights on the civilian population of the city. Testimonies of the urbicide in Sarajevo, in the cultural production of confessional literature during the siege, clearly show the dramatic plunge in the standard of living, the overtaking and militarization of the public space, and the daily struggle of the citizens to get basic supplies such as food and water. In other cases, such as the Porta Farm evacuation and demolition of settlements by the Harare local government, there is evidence of violation of these basic human rights as specified by the International Law and the International Covenant on Economic, Social and Cultural Rights. Despite the specified violations, however, it might be useful to apply, as with genocide, the umbrella term urbicide for these and other cases of urban destruction.

The prospects for a codified prohibition of urbicide might benefit from differentiating the term's legal articulation from human rights law, just as urbicide conceptually separates itself from human rights. With the city as the site of urbicide, the traditional nation-state parties to international legislation might not suffice alone as stake-holders in any legal process, customary or otherwise. However, too much localizing of the criminalization of urbicide risks exonerating by inaction the governments often implicated as aggressors against the city and its citizens. It is often against their power interest to prosecute urbicide or to establish any form of judicial framework that deals explicitly with violations of such nature.

The inclusion of governments into the process is desirable, but their willingness to submit to another kind of scrutiny: particularly under the broad definitions of structural violence that often enter discourses on urbicide. They could presumably make their way into the legal discourses, as well.

The lack of explicit terminology that would address the destruction of cities in legal terms on the international level makes it unlikely that the international courts will take the issue more seriously. The problem is also with the enforcement of these laws on the international level, which have previously unenforced, even the human rights laws already in place.

Decisions of the International court, such as the case of reparations to Bosnia by the Serbian government for crimes against humanity, in which the court, in February 2007, acquitted Serbia of the duty to give reparations, perhaps demonstrate the further need to distinguish between urbicide and genocide. In the case of Sarajevo, where the case of genocide, as legally understood, could not be unequivocally applied to cases such as the Siege of Sarajevo, the concept of urbicide might provide a better interpretive framework for the violence inflicted upon the Sarajevo populace and their urban environment, such as the shared public space and the architecture of the city. The goal of such violence may have not been to destroy a minority population and their cultural and symbolic space, as in cases of genocide but to fragment the heterogeneous population of the city into homogeneous enclaves based on the ethnicity of the population. Thus, the violence is not directed towards an ethnicity per se, but towards the city as a heterogeneous space where different cultural identities can live and interact without antagonism.

See also

Structural violence
Urban decay

References

Abujidi Nurhan and Verschure Han, “Military Occupation as Urbicide by ‘Construction & Destruction’:the Case of Nablus, Palestine”, The Arab World Geographer/Le Géographe du mond arabe, Vol.9, No.2:2006
 Moorcock, Michael. "Dead God's Homecoming", in Science Fantasy #59, Nova Publishing, (June 1963)
 Berman, Marshall. "Falling Towers: City Life After Urbicide," in Dennis Crow, ed., Geography and Identity. (Washington, 1996): 172-192.
 Bevan, Robert. The Destruction of Memory.  London: Reaktion Books, 2006.
 Coward, Martin. "Urbicide in Bosnia," in Stephen Graham, ed., Cities, War, and Terrorism: Towards an Urban Geopolitics. (London: Blackwell, 2004): 154-171.
 Graham, Stephen.  "Cities, Warfare, and States of Emergency," in Stephen Graham, ed., Cities, War, and Terrorism: Towards an Urban Geopolitics.  (London: Blackwell, 2004): 1-25.
 
 Kanishka Goonewardena, "Colonization and the New Imperialism:  On the Meaning of Urbicide Today": 1-26.
 Shaw, Martin.  "New Wars of the City: ‘Urbicide' and ‘Genocide,'" in Stephen Graham, ed., Cities, War, and Terrorism: Towards an Urban Geopolitics.  (London: Blackwell, 2004): 141-153.

Further reading
 
 "Dead God's Homecoming", Science Fantasy #59, Michael Moorcock
 "Falling Towers: City Life After Urbicide," Marshall Berman
 "Colonization and the new imperialism: on the meaning of urbicide today," Kanishka Goonewardena
 "New Wars of the City: Urbicide and Genocide," Martin Shaw
 "The Pentagon as global slumlord," Mike Davis
 "City and Death," Bogdan Bogdanovic
 "On the natural history of destruction," W.G. Sebald
 "Planet of Slums," Mike Davis.
 Abujidi Nurhan and Verschure, Han (2006) Military Occupation as Urbicide by “Construction and Destruction”: The Case of Nablus, Palestine.
 "American Urbicide," Andrew Herscher.  Journal of Architectural Education, 60:1 (September 2006).
 "The Destruction of Memory," Robert Bevan
 "Cities, War, and Terrorism: Towards an Urban Geopolitics," Stephen Graham
 "Urbicide: The politics of urban destruction", Martin Coward (2008)

External  links

 'Urbicide' Overview & Conference Information
 'Urbicide' in the West Bank-an article by Stephen Graham
 Final Report of the UN Commission of Experts on the Siege of Sarajevo
 Survival Map of Sarajevo
 Photos of the Siege of Sarajevo
 James Carrol, "Katrina's Truths."
 Alan Berube and Bruce Katz, "Katrina's Window: Confronting Concentrated Poverty Across America"
 Martin Shaw, "New Wars of the City: 'urbicide' and 'genocide'" - cities in warfare past and present.
 Marshall Berman, "Among the Ruins." - urbicide in New York's Bronx district
 Martin Coward, Community as heterogeneous ensemble: Mostar and multiculturalism. - paper on war in Bosnia and urbicide
 The Meanings of Violence and the Violence of Meanings - various discussions of violence
 Robert Gilman, "Structural Violence"-unequal distribution of wealth and violence
  Eyal Weizman's "The Politics of Verticality"
 Robert Moses' Plan for New York
  
 Down with the Cities! The case for universal urbicide

Urban studies and planning terminology